Zdeněk Lubenský (born 3 December 1962) is a Czech athlete. He competed in the men's pole vault at the 1988 Summer Olympics.

References

External links
 

1962 births
Living people
Athletes (track and field) at the 1988 Summer Olympics
Czech male pole vaulters
Olympic athletes of Czechoslovakia
People from Kutná Hora
Sportspeople from the Central Bohemian Region